Gráinne Hambly is an internationally known Irish traditional harper, teacher and musician.

Life and education
Hambly was born to Michael Hambly and Mary Joyce in Knockrickard County Mayo, Ireland in 1975. She has 2 sisters who are also musicians. She learned traditional Irish music on the tin whistle as a child and then learned the concertina and harp. Hambly won the All-Ireland senior competition in Clonmel in 1994 on the concertina. She also won the Harp Festivals competitions at Keadue in 1994 and Granard in 1995 and the All-Ireland senior harp competition in 1994. She was also a member of the National Folk Orchestra and toured with the Belfast Harp Orchestra founded by Janet Harbison. She graduated initially with a bachelor's degree and then with a master's degree in Music from Queen's University Belfast in 1999. She then completed a graduate diploma in Education (Music) from the University of Limerick.

She is a teacher of traditional Irish music and performs in concerts and festivals internationally as well as having had a number of records produced.

Works

 Between the Showers
 Golden Lights and Green Shadows
 The Thorn Tree
 Music from Ireland and Scotland
 Traditional Irish Music Arranged for Harp

References

External links
And Interview with harpers
Achill harp festival

1975 births
Living people
Irish harpists
Musicians from County Mayo